Early Alchemy is a compilation album produced by Nick Webb of Acoustic Alchemy and the sixth album overall, released on 16 March 1992.

The album was put together from old recordings and outtakes by Webb and Simon James, to give insight into the progression of the band's music.

The album contains the original recordings of "Sarah Victoria" and "Casino", successful Acoustic Alchemy songs co-written by James.

The instrumental make-up of the band differs here too, with a double bass, percussionist and string quartet (The Violettes) backing up the sound of the dual acoustic guitars.

Track listing

Personnel 

 – percussion, sound effects, finger snaps
Andy Baltimore – creative director
Francis Bucknall – cello
Mike Caldwell – photography
Jeff Clyne – bass, composer, double bass
Joseph Doughney – producer, digital editing, post production
John Earls – violin
Klaus Genuit – engineer, remixing
David Gibb – design
Katy Hull – violin
Martin Humbey – viola
Simon James – guitar, composer, guitar (steel)
Ted Jensen – mastering
Scott Johnson – design
Doreen Kalcich – assistant producer
Michael Landy – producer, digital editing, post production
Ron Mathewson – double bass
Ron Mathewson – bass
Sonny Mediana – design
John O'Keeny – percussion, conductor, vibraphone
John Parsons – percussion, guitar (steel), sound effects, engineer, finger snaps, remixing
Michael Pollard – production coordination
Andy Ruggirello – design
Dan Serrano – design
Rod Shone – photography
Klaus Sperber – bass
Trevor Tomkins – percussion
The Violettes – strings
Nick Webb – composer, guitar (steel), producer, engineer, liner notes, remixing
Gareth Winters – cover design
Adam Zelinka – producer, digital editing, post production

References

Acoustic Alchemy albums
1992 compilation albums
GRP Records compilation albums